Marau is an Eastern Malayo-Polynesian language spoken on the south coast of Serui Island of the Ambai Islands group in Cenderawasih Bay, within Papua Province of Western New Guinea, northeastern Indonesia.

References

South Halmahera–West New Guinea languages
Languages of western New Guinea
Ambai Islands
Papua (province) culture